Bedok is a planning area and matured residential town located in the geographical region of Tanah Merah along the south-eastern coast of the East Region of Singapore. Bedok is bounded by five other planning areas: Paya Lebar to the north, Hougang to the northwest, Tampines to the northeast and east, Geylang to the west and Marine Parade to the southwest. It also shares a maritime boundary with the Singapore Strait to the south and southeast.

Bedok has a rich history, with evidence of human settlement dating back to the 14th century. The area was originally a fishing village and agriculture centre, but over the years it has transformed into a bustling residential and commercial hub. Today, Bedok is known for its vibrant and diverse community, with a mix of public and private housing options, shopping centers, parks, and a thriving food scene.

In addition to its commercial development, Bedok also boasts several green spaces and parks, including Bedok Reservoir Park and East Coast Park, providing residents with ample opportunities for recreation and relaxation. The area is also well-connected to the rest of the city, with a number of transportation options, including MRT stations, bus routes, and major expressways, making it an accessible and convenient location for residents and visitors alike.

Population wise, Bedok is the largest planning area in the country, being home to approximately 280,000 residents. This high demographic is largely explained by the affordable public housing in Bedok New Town, due to its relatively distant location from the Central Area. Besides public housing developments, private residences are also prevalent in the area, most of which are found in the neighbourhoods of Bayshore, Frankel Avenue and Siglap, in western and southwestern Bedok.

Etymology

The origin of the name "Bedok" likely comes from the Malay word for "drum", a reference to the sound of drums heard in the area during traditional festivals and ceremonies.
Its use was known as early as 1604 in Manuel Godinho de Erédia's map of Singapore. The map refers to the Bedok River (present-day Sungei Bedok) as Sune Bodo.

History

As part of the Tanah Merah region, Bedok's history is largely influenced by its coastal frontier. The general area known as Bedok today was first mentioned in maps dating to the pre-Raffles era. After Singapore was colonised by the British in 1819, Simpang Bedok Village became an ethnically mixed community consisting of Chinese and Malay peoples. Before the 1960s, Bedok's primary source of income was coconut, which was harvested from the plantations found in the Siglap subzone. Fishing was another primary source of income for the villagers of Simpang Bedok at the time.

The modern development of Bedok only began in 1966, when reclamation works along the coastal area began. In the following decade, Bedok was transformed by the Housing and Development Board (HDB) into the country's fifth self-contained new town, with the first residential flats emerging in the vicinity by 1975. Following the Fall of Saigon that same year, Bedok Jetty became a focal point for Vietnamese refugees landing in Singapore during Operation Thunderstorm.

Bedok Town had been developed since 1973, with the newer roads such as Bedok Plain, Bedok Highway, and Bedok Heights being built until 1975. The New Upper Changi Road was fully built and opened in 1979, where the massive development had been completed except Bedok Reservoir and Kaki Bukit, which was built later between 1983 and 1988.

Geography

Location
Bedok Planning Area is located within the East Region of Singapore, along Pulau Ujong's southeastern coast. It is bounded by Paya Lebar to the north, Hougang to the northwest, Tampines to the northeast and east, Geylang to the west, and Marine Parade to the southwest.

Bedok New Town sits within the Bedok Planning Area.

Subzones
Bedok is divided into 8 subzones:

Infrastructure

It was formerly a hilly region, and hence the focal point of orientation of the town is the special landscaped park and sports complex built on the higher ground of the town. The residential blocks, as well as the industrial area, are planned based on the neighbourhood concept. There is also a town centre situated between the present Bedok Mall and the former Bedok Point site. Plans for an integrated complex, which will be as big as three football fields, have also been revealed in 2014. This complex, Heartbeat @ Bedok, houses a sports centre, library, clinic, centre for the elderly, and the Kampong Chai Chee Community Club. The complex is located in the Bedok Town centre and was completed in 2017.

Residential development
Some 58,000 units of flats were built by the HDB in Bedok New Town. As one of the older towns, the majority of the flats are 3-room or 4-room. There are also some 2,700 and 583 units of executive and Housing and Urban Development Corporation flats. It provides housing for some 200,000 residents.

Transportation
There are currently six Mass Rapid Transit stations in the Bedok planning area across two lines, the East-West Line and the Downtown Line. Both lines run parallel to one another and do not have an interchange station in Bedok. However, the Tanah Merah MRT Station of EWL is an interchange station with the Changi Airport Branch Line (CG). The six stations are:

Tanah Merah
Bedok
Kembangan
Kaki Bukit
Bedok North
Bedok Reservoir

The future stations of the Thomson-East Coast Line that are currently under construction will be operational in 2023 and 2024 under stages 4 and 5, respectively. The line will run south of the planning area and have an interchange station with the Downtown Line at Sungei Bedok station, which will also be the terminus for both lines. The five future stations are:

Marine Terrace
Siglap
Bayshore
Bedok South
Sungei Bedok

The Bedok Bus Interchange opened in 1979, as part of the Bedok Town Centre, located along Bedok North Road and between Block 203 and 207, next to community amenities such as a food centre, library, and sports complex, with the allocated Block 207A. There were thirty-three end-on berths with ten services occupying it and six sawtooth berths, each occupying three bus services in the original facility. Several bus services were moved to the interchange from Chai Chee Bus Terminal when it closed in 1985. Bedok MRT station opened in 1989 at the south of the original facility, complementing the bus interchange to serve people travelling within Bedok town and also the nearby East Coast Park.

On 19 November 2011, after operating from the original facility for 32 years, the bus interchange moved to its temporary facility west of the original facility, at the junction of Bedok North Drive and Bedok North Avenue 1, to allow the original facility to be redeveloped into Bedok Mall.

The new Bedok Integrated Transport Hub (ITH) began operations on 30 November 2014. With the completion of the ITH, Bedok residents can transfer in air-conditioned comfort between bus and MRT services at Bedok MRT station. It is the 7th air-conditioned bus interchange in Singapore.

Parks
The parks in the area include Bedok Town Park, located beside the Pan Island Expressway between Bedok North Road and Bedok Avenue 3, and the  Bedok Reservoir Park alongside Bedok Reservoir.

Politics
The area of Bedok falls under three constituencies and nine divisions following the 2020 elections, which were Aljunied GRC, East Coast GRC, and Marine Parade GRC.

The Aljunied GRC covers northern Bedok along with the subdivisions of Kaki Bukit and Bedok Reservoir; its MPs were the secretary-general of the Workers' Party (WP) Pritam Singh, former NCMP Gerald Giam and Muhamad Faisal Manap, and WP had held on to the constituency since the 2011 election where it was first led by then-secretary general Low Thia Khiang. Before 2011, Aljunied GRC was under the ruling People's Action Party (PAP) with MPs former Foreign Minister George Yeo and Zainul Abidin, while Kaki Bukit was under the Marine Parade GRC where Muhammad Faishal Ibrahim represented the ward back then (now as MP for Nee Soon GRC).

The East Coast GRC covers the central Bedok area, east Siglap, and Bayshore; its MPs are Deputy Prime Minister Heng Swee Keat (an ex-Tampines GRC anchor minister), Jessica Tan Soon Neo, Cheryl Chan, minister Maliki Osman, and Minister of State Tan Kiat How. East Coast GRC has been staged as closed fights against the WP since the 2011 election, but the PAP won the GRC in a narrow margin. Its previous MPs include cabinet ministers such as Lee Yock Suan, S. Jayakumar, Raymond Lim and Lim Swee Say, as well as previous speakers Tan Soo Khoon and Abdullah Tarmugi. For the 2015 election, Chan's ward of Fengshan was carved as an SMC for only one term before reverting to GRC.

The Marine Parade GRC covers Frankel, Kembangan, and west Siglap; its MPs are current Speaker Tan Chuan-Jin and Minister Edwin Tong. Tong's ward of Joo Chiat was a SMC for three elections beginning in 2001 until it was absorbed into GRC in 2015.

Education
The following is the list of schools in Bedok as of 2022:

Primary schools 

 Bedok Green Primary School
 Damai Primary School
 Fengshan Primary School
 Opera Estate Primary School
 Red Swastika School
 St. Anthony's Canossian Primary School
 St. Stephen's School
 Tanjong Katong Primary School
 Telok Kurau Primary School
 Temasek Primary School
 Yu Neng Primary School

Secondary schools 

 Anglican High School
 Bedok Green Secondary School
 Bedok South Secondary School
 Bedok View Secondary School
 Damai Secondary School
 Ping Yi Secondary School
 St. Anthony's Canossian Secondary School
 Temasek Secondary School

Junior colleges 

 Temasek Junior College

Other schools 

 Katong School (APSN)
 NPS International School

Hawker Centres
As of 2020, 10 major hawker centres are located in Bedok that serves local Singaporean cuisine. They are:

 Fengshan Market & Food Centre  
 Bedok Interchange Hawker Centre  
 Blk 216 Bedok Food Centre & Market  
 Kaki Bukit 511 Market & Food Centre 
 Bedok 538 Market & Food Centre 
 Blk 16 Bedok South Market & Food Centre 
 The Marketplace @ 58 
 Bedok Food Centre 
 The Bedok Market Place 
 Blk 630 Bedok Reservoir Market & Food Centre

References

External links
URA Draft Masterplan 2013 Bedok
Victor R Savage, Brenda S A Yeoh (2003), Toponymics – A Study of Singapore Street Names, Eastern Universities Press, 
From National Library Board Singapore, Infopedia website.
Chin, Daryl. (2014). Bedok residents to get a new sports complex, library, and community club under one roof by 2017. The Straits Times. Bedok residents to get new sports complex, library and community club under one roof by 2017

 
East Region, Singapore
Places in Singapore